The 2024 United States presidential election in Oklahoma is scheduled to take place on Tuesday, November 5, 2024, as part of the 2024 United States elections in which all 50 states plus the District of Columbia will participate. Oklahoma voters will choose electors to represent them in the Electoral College via a popular vote. The state of Oklahoma has seven electoral votes in the Electoral College, following reapportionment due to the 2020 United States census in which the state neither gained nor lost a seat.

Primary elections

Republican primary 

The Oklahoma Republican primary is scheduled to be held on Super Tuesday, March 5, 2024.

General election

Polling
Donald Trump vs. Joe Biden

Ron DeSantis vs. Joe Biden

See also 
 United States presidential elections in Oklahoma
 2024 United States presidential election
 2024 Democratic Party presidential primaries
 2024 Republican Party presidential primaries
 2024 United States elections

Notes

References 

Oklahoma
2024
Presidential